José Luis Martí Soler (born 28 April 1975) is a Spanish professional football manager and former player who played as a central midfielder. 

Known for his tactical awareness, he amassed La Liga totals of 336 matches and eight goals over 13 seasons, representing Mallorca (two spells), Tenerife and Sevilla. He won five major titles with the latter club, including two UEFA Cups.

Martí started working as a manager in 2015, going on to spend three seasons in Segunda División with Tenerife and one apiece in the same tier with Deportivo, Girona, Leganés and Sporting de Gijón.

Playing career

Early years and Tenerife
Martí was born in Palma de Mallorca. Having starting playing professionally with hometown's RCD Mallorca, making his first-team debut at the age of already 25 in the 1999–2000 season (one game, one minute against Deportivo Alavés), he switched the following campaign to the Canary Islands, joining CD Tenerife in the Segunda División and being instrumental in the team's promotion to La Liga.

Sevilla
After Tenerife's top-division relegation, Martí played one more season with the club, then returned to the top flight as he joined Sevilla FC in July 2003, going on to become a regular in the Andalusia side's exploits in the subsequent years – for instance, as they won back-to-back UEFA Cups, he totalled 24 appearances scoring two goals, both through penalties.

In May 2007, Martí extended his contract with Sevilla until 2010. However, having lost his importance in 2007–08, he was loaned to Real Sociedad in January 2008, but the Basques ultimately failed to return to the top tier.

Mallorca
33-year-old Martí returned to Mallorca in July 2008, for about €500.000, being an undisputed starter in the first year upon his return and the following, when the Balearic Islands side were edged in the last matchday for the final berth for the UEFA Champions League, precisely by former club Sevilla. Again from the penalty spot, he netted his only goal of the season at Sporting de Gijón on 4 October 2009 (4–1 defeat).

Martí renewed his link on 29 June 2011, until the following year. Still first choice, the captain saw the team be relegated to division two in 2013, the first time in 16 years.

One month after his 40th birthday, Martí announced he would retire from football at the end of the 2014–15 campaign, with Mallorca still in the second division.

Coaching career
Martí was appointed manager of Tenerife on 4 November 2015, replacing fired Raül Agné. He was himself relieved of his duties on 4 February 2018 after four league games without a win, totalling 39 wins, 40 draws and 29 defeats during his spell.

On 8 April 2019, after more than a year without a club, Martí signed for Deportivo de La Coruña in place of Natxo González who had been fired a day earlier. In late June, after leading the team to the sixth position in the regular season and falling short in the promotion play-offs, he left.

On 28 October 2019, Martí replaced the dismissed Juan Carlos Unzué at the helm of Girona FC also in the second division. He was shown the door the following 30 June, with the side in fifth and therefore in the playoffs.

Martí remained in the second tier in August 2020, taking the reins of CD Leganés who had recently been relegated. He was sacked on 26 January 2021, after a five-match winless streak.

On 23 February 2022, Martí replaced David Gallego at the helm of Sporting de Gijón, still in the second division. On 3 May, after just one win in ten games, he was dismissed.

Managerial statistics

Honours
Sevilla
Copa del Rey: 2006–07
Supercopa de España: 2007
UEFA Cup: 2005–06, 2006–07
UEFA Super Cup: 2006; runner-up 2007

References

External links

1975 births
Living people
Spanish footballers
Footballers from Palma de Mallorca
Association football midfielders
La Liga players
Segunda División players
Segunda División B players
Tercera División players
RCD Mallorca B players
RCD Mallorca players
CD Tenerife players
Sevilla FC players
UEFA Cup winning players
Real Sociedad footballers
Spanish football managers
Segunda División managers
CD Tenerife managers
Deportivo de La Coruña managers
Girona FC managers
CD Leganés managers
Sporting de Gijón managers